The state of Oklahoma is served by the following area codes:

 405, which serves central Oklahoma including Oklahoma City (original area code created in 1947; 572 added as overlay on April 24th, 2021
 580, which serves western and southern Oklahoma (split from 405 in 1997)
 539/918, which serves northeastern Oklahoma including Tulsa (918 created in 1953 as split from 405; 539 added as overlay in 2011)

References

Area code list
 
Oklahoma
Area codes